The 2004 Alor earthquake occurred on the island of Alor at 21:26:41 UTC on 11 November. Alor is an island located in Indonesia, the largest island of the Alor Archipelago with almost 16,800 residents. It was recorded on 301 stations. Hundreds of homes and much infrastructure was damaged with 23 deaths and thousands of casualties.

Geological background

Tectonic setting 

Alor island is of volcanic origin, forming part of the Banda Arc, which was formed by the subduction of the Australian Plate beneath the Eurasian Plate. Currently the Banda Arc is involved in the early stages of an Arc-Continent collision, as continental crust of the Australian Plate becomes involved in this boundary. Several microplates have been formed, including the Banda Sea Plate and the Timor Plate.The boundary between these two microplates is a north-dipping subduction zone, movement on which has caused large earthquakes in the past, including the 1991 Kalabahi earthquakes that resulted in 23 fatalities.

Aftershocks 
There were over 30 noticeable aftershocks between 11 May to 13 May, in the range from  4.1 to 5.4. The aftershocks occurred almost hourly immediately after the mainshock.

Tsunami

From the official website of the United States National Tsunami Warning Center, NOAA/NWS, according to the research of the Indonesian Meteorological and Geophysical Agency (BMKG), a tsunami followed  with the tsunami reaching 50 meters inland.

There were a series of subsequent effect on the local area:

Kalabahi city was severely damaged by the tsunami as well as from the continuous aftershocks of the earthquake. Located in the valley between hills, Bukapiting village, was completely destroyed. A landslide also caused by the earthquake destroyed the road that connects Kalabahi and Maritaing villages.

In Dali, a floating hotel in the natural harbor was pushed to the shore after the earthquake caused water to recede.

Some 649 houses were damaged and 205 of them were severely damaged or destroyed. There was large scale destruction of government infrastructure. Three schools and eight places of worship collapsed. The electricity grid of Alor island was shut down temporarily.

Moreover, airplanes were not able to land, because of the destruction of the local airport in Kalabahi city. Many cracks appeared in the runways, shutting down air services.

Historical earthquakes in nearby regions since 2000

On May 4, 2000, an earthquake measured at of 7.5 on the Richter scale, 7.5 , shook the Sulawesi Province, resulting in 35 deaths. Later the same year on June 4, a 7.9  earthquake, with an epicentre in Bengkulu Province, caused over 117 deaths.

In 2004, on February 6, a 6.9  earthquake, occurred at Papua. The aftershocks caused over 34 deaths. Another, on November 26, 6.4  earthquake, centred near West Papua, caused over 30 deaths. At the end of the year, on Boxing Day, an earthquake and tsunami occurred in the seabed off Sumatra, which affected over 20 nearby countries and took over 220,000 lives.

In 2005, on March 28, an 8.7  earthquake, centred near Nias and Simeulue islands away from the Sumatra west shore, which caused over 900 deaths.

Another earthquake on May 27, 2006, measuring 6.4 , with an epicentre near the central city of Yogyakarta, caused over 5,000 deaths.

Damage and casualties 
According to OCHA Situation Report No. 1

According to ABC News Online 14 November 2004
Many roads on Alor island have been badly damaged

Social reactions 
At the first phase of Alor earthquake November 2004, 4,500 affected households received emergency shelter and non-perishable material; after, the same number of households are assigned with the essential building material and basic tools

According to the red cross document, the residual balance of CHF 420,054 (66% of the total emergency appeal income), was assigned to the Tsunami Emergency and Recovery Program 2005 - 2010 for Indonesia. The detailed composition of the funds' balance is in the following:

Donor Funds (CHF)

And according to the UN Office for the Coordination of Humanitarian Affairs:

“cash assistance allocated by the central government has rounded about USD 172,000.”

International Help 

International assistance has been provided by the governments below

International organizations involved are:

IFRC, MSF-B, WVI, CRS, CWS, Oxfam GB, and GTZ-Siskes.

Reconstruction of the earthquake 
Infrastructure is now being reinforced by anti-seismic design with the shock-resistant technology; mostly in houses and the schools. They are mostly able to resist earthquakes measuring to 8 on the Richter scale.

Memorial 
The disaster is commemorated on 10 December of every year with most of the local schools gather and singing songs to the national flag. The local government and media will also memorize that earthquake on TV channels and official websites by documentary films and videos. 
The total amount of help donated to victims is  420,054.

Impact on economy 
All industries were affected in the short and long term. The residents in Alor island still practice subsistence agriculture with poorly developed infrastructure which is prone to frequent natural disasters. Another main industry on the island is the fishing industry and the mining industry with natural gas, ipsum, kaolin, petroleum, tin, gold and various diamond mines on the island. The island is a recognised diving destination, making local tourism one of the major income source of Alor inhabitants, with mainly diving and snorkeling.

References

External links
 

2004 disasters in Indonesia
Earthquakes in Indonesia
2004 earthquakes
2004 in Indonesia
Alor Archipelago